Farm to Market Road 1719 (FM 1719) is a farm to market road in the Amarillo metropolitan area of the Texas Panhandle.

Route description

FM 1719 begins at  BL I-40 (Amarillo Boulevard) and travels northward along Western Street. Along this segment, the roadway is four-laned with a center turn lane until the intersection at NW 24th Avenue. After leaving the city limits, the route intersects  Loop 335 and becomes a two-lane roadway. It continues northward before turning to the east along Givens Avenue. The route intersects FM 2176 before ending at the US 87/US 287 freeway.

History
A previous route numbered FM 1719 was designated in Kendall County on May 23, 1951, from US 87 to the Bandera County line. That route was cancelled on July 18, 1951, becoming part of  RM 475 (later  SH 46).

The current FM 1719 was also designated on May 23, 1951. Given that two  roads were designated FM 1719 that day, it is likely that one of them was supposed to be numbered FM 819. When US 87 (and then  US 287) were rerouted to the new Dumas Highway on June 21, 1977, the segment of FM 1719 from the new freeway to the old alignment (now designated  Loop 434) was transferred to Loop 335, which had been designated around the southern and western sides of Amarillo that year.

On June 27, 1995, TxDOT internally redesignated FM 1719 as Urban Road 1719 (UR 1719). The designation reverted to FM 1719 with the elimination of the Urban Road system on November 15, 2018.

In 1999, the Texas Transportation Commission allocated $3.9 million for the addition of shoulders to Western Street north of Loop 335, with the goal of adding that segment to FM 1719. The route reached its current length on March 31, 2005, when that northward extension and an eastward segment (which usurped a segment of FM 2176) were added, once again connecting FM 1719 with the Dumas Highway. The improvements related to this extension were completed in 2008 at a cost of approximately $360,000.

Major intersections

References

1719
Transportation in Potter County, Texas